Drive Me Crazy is a 1999 American teen romantic comedy film based on the novel How I Created My Perfect Prom Date by Todd Strasser. Originally entitled Next to You, the film's title was changed to Drive Me Crazy after one of the songs from its soundtrack, "(You Drive Me) Crazy" by Britney Spears. The film grossed $22,593,409 worldwide, against an $8 million budget, making it a moderate box office success. The soundtrack featured The Donnas, who also appeared in the film.

Plot
Nicole and Chase have lived next door to each other their whole lives and were childhood best friends, until junior high school when Nicole joined the popular crowd while Chase began to rebel and pull pranks around school, constantly landing him in detention. During their senior year, Nicole devotes much of her time and energy into planning their high school's centennial dance, which she expects to go to with a basketball player named Brad but he falls in love with a cheerleader from a rival school and asks her to the dance instead of Nicole.  Chase is dating Dulcie, though she ultimately leaves him for a socially conscious college student. One night, Nicole calls Chase and asks him to the dance, suggesting that they pretend to date to make Brad and Dulcie jealous, he agrees to her scheme and they both agree to have an easy out clause in the relationship, so it can end at any time with no hard feelings.

Nicole gives Chase a makeover so that he fits in better with her friend group and takes him to events where he becomes friends with the popular kids, all while insisting to his old friends, Dave and Ray, that the whole thing is just a scam and that he hasn't really changed, though it's clear to them that he has.  While Chase does all the activities Nicole asks him to with little resistance, he eventually points out that everything they've done is for her benefit.  Nicole agrees to do whatever he wants and they go to a club he used to frequent with Dulcie, where Nicole has a good time and begins bonding with his friends. Chase has a run in with Dulcie and her new boyfriend, Nicole comes to his aid and kisses him, which makes Dulcie jealous. Nicole and Chase begin to fall in love but don't admit their feelings, to each other or themselves, and continue their ruse.  Nicole's vindictive best friend, Alicia, seduces Chase at a party, making sure Nicole would see them together, leaving Nicole heartbroken. Chase calls Dave to pick him up, since he is too drunk to drive, and angers Dave when he says that "everyone" was at the party, which Dave says is not true because he and Ray were not there, reminding him they used to be his friends. Meanwhile, Brad and his girlfriend break up and Dulcie also ends things with her new boyfriend. Chase attempts to talk to Nicole about what happened with Alicia but she rebuffs him, reminding him of the easy out clause, she also ignores his calls. Chase eventually makes up with his friends and gets back together with Dulcie. Brad finally asks Nicole to the dance. Despite getting what they both wanted from the beginning, Chase is unhappy with Dulcie and Nicole rejects Brad.

The night of the dance, with no date, Nicole calls Ray, who had offered to take her earlier, and goes to the dance with him.  While Chase is out with Dulcie, she realizes he doesn't want to be there, or be with her.  Ray and Nicole have fun together at the dance, but he leaves when Chase arrives, knowing that despite their claims that their relationship was never real, Chase is the one she wants to be with.  Chase asks Nicole to dance, she asks who they're trying to make jealous now, he tells her everyone.

In the final scene, Chase and Nicole come home early the next morning and Nicole walks Chase to his door, they kiss then find her mother with his father.  Their parents tell them that they're also in a relationship and are going to move in together. Nicole suggests she and Chase discuss the new living arrangements in the treehouse they used to play in as children.  They hold hands as they walk into Nicole's backyard, then hug and kiss under the treehouse.

Cast

Filming locations
Drive Me Crazy was filmed in and around Salt Lake City, Utah, including  Sandy and Ogden. The high school scenes were filmed at Ogden High School. The street scene with 'Union Station' in the background features Ogden's Historic 25th Street and Union Station. The dance club scene was filmed inside the now-closed "Club Vortex" on Exchange Place. The mall scene was filmed at South Towne Center.

Release
The film opened in the United States and Canada on October 1, 1999 in 2,222 theaters.

Critical reception
On Rotten Tomatoes the film has a score of 27% based on reviews from 37 critics. The site's consensus states: "Unoriginal story."

Box office
The film opened the same weekend as Three Kings in 720 fewer theaters, and opened at number six at the United States box office for the weekend with a gross of $6,846,112.  The film went on to gross $17,845,337 in the United States and Canada and $4.7 million internationally, for a worldwide total of $22.6 million. Due to its low budget of $8.5 million, the picture was expected to recover its costs.

Soundtrack

The soundtrack was released on September 28, 1999, by Jive Records.

 Track listing
 "(You Drive Me) Crazy" (The Stop Remix!) - Britney Spears (3:17)
 "Unforgetful You" - Jars of Clay (3:21) 
 "I Want It That Way" (Jack D. Elliot Radio Mix) - Backstreet Boys  (4:05)
 "It's All Been Done" - Barenaked Ladies (3:28)
 "Stranded" - Plumb (3:38)
 "Faith In You" - Matthew Sweet (3:32)
 "Is This Really Happening to Me?" - Phantom Planet (2:45)
 "One for Sorrow" (Tony Moran's 7" Mix) - Steps (3:30)
 "Hammer to the Heart" - The Tamperer featuring Maya (3:13)
 "Sugar" - Don Philip (3:51)
 "Regret" - Mukala (4:29)
 "Original" - Silage (2:15)
 "Help Save the Youth of America from Exploding" - Less Than Jake (2:54)
 "Keep on Loving You" - The Donnas (3:04)

"Turbo-Teen", the film's theme by Sugar High, was not included on the soundtrack. "Run Baby Run" from Deadstar, played during the club scene, was not included on the soundtrack.

References

External links 
 
 
 
 

1999 films
1990s high school films
1999 romantic comedy films
1990s teen comedy films
1990s teen romance films
20th Century Fox films
American high school films
American romantic comedy films
American teen comedy films
American teen romance films
Films based on American novels
Films based on young adult literature
Films directed by John Schultz (director)
Films shot in Salt Lake City
Films about proms
1990s English-language films
1990s American films